Anthony Seuseu (born ) is a New Zealand former professional rugby league footballer. He is the younger brother of Jerry Seuseu.

Playing career

Early years
A Counties Manukau Heroes player in the Lion Red Cup, in 1998 Seuseu played for the Mangere East Hawks in the Auckland Rugby League competition.

In New Zealand
Seuseu then joined the Hibiscus Coast Raiders, playing in New Zealand's Bartercard Cup. He toured Australia with the New Zealand Residents in 2000. Like his brother Jerry he eventually made the New Zealand Warriors squad, playing one National Rugby League game in 2001. In 2002 he was again in the squad however he did not play any first grade games.

Move to England
Seuseu signed for the Halifax in 2003, a club in the English Super League. However, due to work permit problems his arrival was held up and he was rushed into the squad, playing his first game the week he arrived. He played twelve games for Halifax, however his time there was not a happy one. By March he was playing games for the Academy side. He left the club in June and was later named in a Most Embarrassing Team selection.

He joined Doncaster for the remainder of the year, playing in the National Leagues.

Retirement 

Seuseu has since returned to New Zealand. In 2007 he was the trainer for the Auckland Harbour U/18's side.

References 

Living people
New Zealand rugby league players
Hibiscus Coast Raiders players
New Zealand Warriors players
Halifax R.L.F.C. players
Doncaster R.L.F.C. players
Mangere East Hawks players
Counties Manukau rugby league team players
Auckland rugby league team players
Rugby league props
Year of birth missing (living people)